This article provides a listing with simple descriptions of the streets in the Puerto Rican municipality of San Juan.

List of streets

References

External links

 

Streets in San Juan

Transportation in San Juan, Puerto Rico
San Juan–Caguas–Guaynabo metropolitan area
San Juan
Puerto Rico transport-related lists
San Juan, Puerto Rico-related lists
San Juan